Arshaduzzaman Bangladesh Nationalist Party politician. He was elected a member of parliament from Bagerhat-4 in February 1996.

Career 
Arshaduzzaman was elected to parliament from Bagerhat-3 as a Bangladesh Nationalist Party candidate in 15 February 1996 Bangladeshi general election.

References 

Possibly living people
Year of birth missing (living people)
People from Bagerhat District
Bangladesh Nationalist Party politicians
6th Jatiya Sangsad members